Joan Herp Morell (born 18 October 1993) is a Spanish sailor. He and Jordi Xammar placed 12th in the men's 470 event at the 2016 Summer Olympics.

Notes

References

External links
 
 
 

1993 births
Living people
Spanish male sailors (sport)
Olympic sailors of Spain
Sailors at the 2016 Summer Olympics – 470